The Ball State Cardinals women's basketball team represents the Ball State University in women's basketball. The school competes in the Mid-American Conference in Division I of the National Collegiate Athletic Association (NCAA). The Cardinals play home basketball games at Worthen Arena on the Ball State campus in Muncie, Indiana.

Season-by-season record
As of the 2016–17 season, the Cardinals have a 523–629 record, with a 273–322 record in the Mid-American Conference. Ball State has won the Mid-American Conference women's basketball tournament once, in 2009, while finishing as runner-up in 2002, 2003, 2007, and 2014. In their lone appearance in the Tournament, the Cardinals (ranked as a 12 seed) beat the 5th seeded Tennessee Lady Volunteers 71–55, the first ever loss for the Lady Vols in the first round. They lost in the second round to Iowa State 71–57. They have won the MAC West Division in 2002, 2003, 2007, 2008, 2009, 2015 while finishing as regular season champions in 2002 and 2003. They have made eight appearances in the Women's National Invitation Tournament (2002, 2003, 2007, 2013, 2014, 2015, 2016, and 2017), with a WNIT Final 16 appearance in 2013 and a Second Round appearance in 2016. On December 21, 2017, the Cardinals defeated Western Kentucky and remained undefeated in non-conference play for the first time in school history.

Postseason appearances

NCAA Division I Tournament appearances

References

External links